The Stellantis Kenitra plant is a Moroccan car plant belonging to French-Italian-American automobile manufacturing group Stellantis. It is located in Ameur Seflia, Kénitra Province. The plant started its operations in June 2019 with an annual output of approximately 200,000 cars.

The plant is designed by Still Industrial and is considered one of the most important industrial plants in Morocco.

References

Motor vehicle assembly plants in Morocco
Kénitra Province
Kenitra